Stranded Pakistanis in Bangladesh are Urdu-speaking Muslim migrants with homelands in present-day Bihar (then part of British India) who settled in East Pakistan (now Bangladesh) following the partition of India in 1947.

This identification can encompass several groups of people. The first among them are Bihari Muslims. Although most of this population belonged to the Bihar Province of British India, there are many from other Indian states such as U.P. (United Provinces or later Uttar Pradesh). There are still others who had settled in what is now known as Bangladesh in the late 19th century.  The second term of reference for this group coined by themselves after the creation of Bangladesh is "Stranded Pakistanis". In Urdu media in Pakistan and elsewhere this was translated as "Mehsooreen" or the "Besieged".  Henceforth any of the above terms may be used to identify this group depending on the context and history.

Biharis were stateless until 2008 when a judgment by the Dhaka High Court gave them right to Bangladeshi citizenship. The judgment does not cover refugees who were adults at the time of Bangladesh Liberation War.
In March 2015, the Ministry of Foreign Affairs of Pakistan said that more than 170,000 Biharis had been repatriated to Pakistan and the remaining 'stranded Pakistanis' are not its responsibility but rather the responsibility of Bangladesh.

Partition
In pre-independence British India, there was an Urdu-speaking Muslim minority in the Hindu majority state of Bihar. In 1947, at the time of partition of India, many Bihari Muslims, many of whom were fleeing the violence that took place during partition, fled to the newly independent East Pakistan, while others went to West Pakistan where they are commonly known as Muhajirs. They held a disproportionate number of positions in the new country because Urdu was made the national language of the new state and as such was, for many Biharis, their mother tongue.

Independence of Bangladesh
In 1971, when the Bangladesh Liberation War broke out between West Pakistan and East Pakistan, the Biharis sided with West Pakistan, opposed the Bengali demand of making Bengali an official language, and chose to maintain Urdu as the state language as for many Bihari, it was their mother tongue. With covert and later overt Indian support, including massive financial assistance, East Pakistan became the independent state of Bangladesh. During the war, there were many attacks on the Bihari community as they were seen as symbols of West Pakistani domination. These attacks included rape, murder, and looting.

Refugee crisis
Due to their initial pro-Pakistan stance, the Biharis were consistent in their wish to be repatriated to Pakistan. Initially, 83,000 Biharis (58,000 former civil servants and military personnel), members of divided families and 25,000 hardship cases were evacuated to Pakistan. The remaining Biharis were now left behind as the Pakistan Army and Pakistani civilians evacuated, and they found themselves unwelcome in both countries. The Pakistani government, at the time, was "struggling to accommodate thousands of Afghan refugees". Additionally, the Pakistani government believed that since Bangladesh was still the successor state of East Pakistan, it had to fulfil its duty in absorbing these refugees just as (West) Pakistan did with the many millions of refugees (incidentally, including some Bengalis) who fled to West Pakistan. Some groups in Pakistan have urged the Pakistan government to accept the Biharis, which is also a key talking point of the Muttahida Qaumi Movement.

In an agreement in 1974 Pakistan accepted 170,000 Bihari refugees; however, the repatriation process subsequently stalled.

Post-independence Bangladesh scorned the Biharis for supporting the Pakistan Army. With neither country offering citizenship, the Biharis were stateless. Organisations like Refugees International urged the governments of Pakistan and Bangladesh to "grant citizenship to the hundreds of thousands of people who remain without effective nationality".

In 2006 a report estimated between 240,000 and 300,000 Biharis lived in 66 crowded camps in Dhaka and 13 other regions across Bangladesh. In 2003, a case came before a high court in which ten Biharis were awarded citizenship according to the court's interpretation of the constitution. Subsequently, however, little progress was made in expanding that ruling to others.  Many Pakistanis and international observers believe the plight of the Biharis has been politicized with political parties giving the refugees false hopes and impracticable expectations.  In recent years, several court rulings in Bangladesh have awarded citizenship to Biharis living in Bengali refugee camps, as the majority of these refugees were born there.  International observers believe that Bangladesh, as the successor state needs to fulfil its international obligations and grant citizenship to this officially stateless ethnic group or arrange for the peaceful repatriation to their native state of Bihar, over the border in India from where they originally hail from.

In a visit to Bangladesh in 2002 Pakistani president Pervez Musharraf said while he had every sympathy for the plight of thousands of people in Bangladesh known as 'stranded Pakistanis', he could not allow them to emigrate to Pakistan as Pakistan was in no position to absorb such a large number of refugees.  He encouraged his Bengali counterpart not to politicize the issue and accept the refugees as citizens being the successor state of East Pakistan.  Pakistani government officials have threatened to deport the more than 1.5 million illegal Bengali refugees living in its country if the issue is not resolved acceptably.

Bangladeshi citizenship
In May 2003 a High Court ruling in Bangladesh allowed ten Biharis to obtain citizenship and voting rights; the ruling also exposed a generation gap amongst Biharis, with younger Biharis tending to be "elated" with the ruling but with many older people "despair[ing] at the enthusiasm" of the younger generation. Many Biharis now seek greater civil rights and citizenship in Bangladesh.

In popular culture 
 Of Martyrs and Marigolds, a novel by Aquila Ismail, highlights the atrocities committed by Bengali nationalists against Biharis during the Bangladesh Liberation War.
 In 2007, prominent Bangladeshi filmmaker Tanvir Mokammel made a documentary film titled The Promised Land. The film highlights the current stateless status of Biharis and their despair of not being able to settle in Pakistan., which they see as a betrayal of Pak government.
 Salman Rushdie's acclaimed fiction novel Midnight Children details the atrocities of the Bangladesh Liberation War and Genocide, specifically in the beginning of Book 3; his protagonist Saleem Sinai takes a farcical part in Operation Searchlight as a human bloodhound.

See also
 Bangladesh–Pakistan relations
 Persecution of Biharis in Bangladesh
 Bengalis in Pakistan
 1971 Bangladesh genocide
 Dhakaia Urdu
 Swapnabhumi (2007)

References

External links
 Stateless people In Bangladesh
 The Forgotten People: Bihari Refugees of Bangladesh, UCANews
 Hindi Story on Stranded Pakistanis by Madhu Kankaria, Shabdankan

Bangladesh Liberation War
Bangladesh–Pakistan relations
 
Ethnic groups in Bangladesh
Immigration to Pakistan
Muhajir communities
Muhajir history
Pakistani diaspora in Asia
Pakistani social culture
Refugees in Bangladesh
Social groups of Pakistan
Statelessness
Urdu-speaking Bangladeshi
Urdu-speaking people by occupation
Urdu-speaking countries and territories